Cornelius "Sonny" Fortune (May 19, 1939 – October 25, 2018) was an American jazz saxophonist. Fortune played soprano, alto, tenor, and baritone saxophones, clarinet, and flute.

Biography
He was born in Philadelphia, Pennsylvania, United States. After moving to New York City in 1967, Fortune recorded and appeared live with drummer Elvin Jones's group. In 1968, he was a member of Mongo Santamaría's band. He performed with singer Leon Thomas, and with pianist McCoy Tyner (1971–73). In 1974, Fortune replaced Dave Liebman in Miles Davis's ensemble, remaining until spring 1975, when he was succeeded by Sam Morrison. Fortune can be heard on the albums Big Fun, Get Up With It, Agharta, and Pangaea, the last two recorded live in Japan.

Fortune joined Nat Adderley after his brief tenure with Davis, then formed his own group in June 1975, recording two albums for the Horizon Records. During the 1990s, he recorded several albums for  Blue Note. He has also performed with Roy Brooks, Buddy Rich, George Benson, Rabih Abou Khalil, Roy Ayers, Oliver Nelson, Gary Bartz, Rashied Ali, and Pharoah Sanders, as well as appearing on the live album The Atlantic Family Live at Montreux (1977).

Fortune died of a stroke at the age of 79 in October 2018.

Discography

As leader
 1966: Trip on the Strip with Stan Hunter (Prestige)
 1974: Long Before Our Mothers Cried (Strata-East)
 1975: Awakening (Horizon)
 1976: Waves of Dreams (Horizon)
 1977: Serengeti Minstrel (Atlantic)
 1978: Infinity Is (Atlantic)
 1979: With Sound Reason (Atlantic)
 1984: Laying It Down  (Konnex)
 1987:  Invitation  (WhyNot)
 1991:  It Ain't What It Was   (Konnex)
 1993: Monk's Mood  (Konnex)
 1994: Four in One (Blue Note)
 1995: A Better Understanding (Blue Note)
 1996: From Now On (Blue Note)
 2000: In the Spirit of John Coltrane (Shanachie)
 2003: Continuum (Sound Reason)
 2007: You and the Night and the Music (18th & Vine)
 2009: Last Night at Sweet Rhythm (Sound Reason)

As sideman
With Rabih Abou-Khalil
 Bukra (MMP, 1988)
 Al-Jadida (Enja, 1990)
With Nat Adderley
 On the Move (Theresa, 1983)
 Blue Autumn (Theresa, 1985)
 Autumn Leaves (Sweet Basil, 1990 [1991])
 Work Song: Live at Sweet Basil (Sweet Basil, 1990 [1993])
With Kenny Barron
 Innocence (Wolf, 1978)
With Gary Bartz
 Alto Memories (Verve, 1994)
With George Benson
 Tell It Like It Is (A&M/CTI, 1969)
With Miles Davis
 Big Fun  (Columbia, 1974)
 Get Up with It (Columbia, 1974)
 Agharta (Columbia, 1975)
 Pangaea (Columbia, 1976)
With Dizzy Gillespie
 Closer to the Source (Atlantic, 1984)
With Elvin Jones
 Elvin Jones Jazz Machine Live at Pit Inn (Polydor (Japan), 1985)
 When I Was at Aso-Mountain (Enja, 1990)
 In Europe (Enja, 1991)
 It Don't Mean a Thing (Enja, 1993) 
With Charles Mingus
 Three or Four Shades of Blues (Atlantic, 1977)
With Alphonse Mouzon
 The Essence of Mystery (Blue Note, 1972)
With Pharoah Sanders
 Izipho Zam (My Gifts) (Strata-East, 1969 [1973])
With Melvin Sparks
 Akilah! (Prestige, 1972)
With Leon Spencer
 Bad Walking Woman (Prestige, 1972)
 Where I'm Coming From (Prestige, 1973)
With Charles Sullivan
 Genesis (Strata-East, 1974)
With McCoy Tyner
 Sahara (Milestone, 1972)
 Song for My Lady (Milestone, 1973)
With Mal Waldron
 Crowd Scene (Soul Note, 1989)
 Where Are You? (Soul Note, 1989)
With Mongo Santamaría
 Stone Soul (1969)

Filmography
 Elvin Jones: Jazz Machine (2008) with Ravi Coltrane, Willie Pickens and Chip Jackson
 Europafest: Jazz Highlights (2008) with Mike Stern,  Bob Berg, Sun Ra, Archie Shepp, John Zorn, Bill Frisell

References

External links
 
 Sonny Fortune's Page at Wide Hive Records
 Entry at discogs.com
 

1939 births
2018 deaths
Musicians from Philadelphia
American jazz alto saxophonists
American jazz baritone saxophonists
American jazz soprano saxophonists
American jazz tenor saxophonists
American male saxophonists
American jazz clarinetists
American jazz flautists
African-American jazz musicians
Miles Davis
Strata-East Records artists
Jazz musicians from Pennsylvania
American male jazz musicians